This aims to be a complete article list of economics topics:

A
 Absence rate – Accountancy – Accounting reform – Actuary – Adaptive expectations – Adverse selection – Agent (economics) – Agent-based computational economics – Aggregate demand – Aggregate supply – Agricultural policy – Appropriate technology – Arbitrage – Arrow's impossibility theorem – Asymmetric information – Auction – Austrian School – Autarky – Awards

B
 Backward induction – Balance of payments – Balance of trade – Bank – Bank reserves – Bankruptcy – Barter – Behavioral economics – Bellman equation – Bequest motive – Big Mac Index – Big Push Model – Bioeconomics (biophysical) – Black market – Black–Scholes – Bretton Woods System – Bullionism – Business cycle – Bertrand–Edgeworth model

C
Capital (economics) – Capital asset – Capital intensity – Capitalism – Cartel – Cash crop – Catch-up effect – Celtic Tiger – Central bank – Ceteris paribus – Charity shop – Chicago School of Economics – Classical economics – Classical general equilibrium model – Coase conjecture – Coase theorem – Cobweb model – Collective action – Collusion – Commodity – Commodity market – Community-based economics – Comparative advantage – Comparative dynamics – Comparative statics – Compensating differential – Competition – Competition law – Complementary good – Complexity economics – Comprehensive Income Policy Agreement – Computational economics – Concentration ratio – Consumer – Consumer price index – Consumer sovereignty – Consumer surplus – Consumer theory – Consumerism – Consumption (economics) – Contestable market – Contract curve – Contract theory – Cooperative – Cost – Cost–benefit analysis – Cost curve – Cost-of-production theory of value – Cost overrun – Cost-push inflation – Cost underestimation – Cournot competition – Cross elasticity of demand – Cultural ecology – Currency – Cycle of poverty

D
 Damages – Dead cat bounce – Deadweight loss – Debt – Decentralization – Deflation – Demand-pull inflation – Depreciation (currency) – Depreciation (economics) – Depression (economics) – Devaluation – Development economics – Differentiated Bertrand competition – Disequilibrium macroeconomics – Disinflation – Dispersed knowledge – Distribution (business) – Distribution (economics) – Distribution of income – Distribution of wealth – Dividend imputation – Division of labor – Dual-sector model – Duopoly – Dynamic programming – Dynamic stochastic general equilibrium

E
 Ecological economics – Econometrics – Economic base analysis – Economic calculation problem – Economic development – Economic equilibrium – Economic geography – Economic graph – Economic growth – Economic history – Economic impact of immigration to Canada – Economic indicator – Economic model – Economic policy – Economic problem – Economic rent – Economic surplus – Economic system – Economic union – Economics – Economics terminology that differs from common usage – Economies of agglomeration – Economies of scale – Economies of scope – Economy of Canada – Ecotax – Edgeworth box – Edgeworth's limit theorem – Efficiency dividend – Efficiency wages – Efficient-market hypothesis – Elasticity (economics) – Elasticity of substitution – Electricity market – Employment – Endogenous growth theory – Energy economics – Entrepreneur – Entrepreneurial economics – Entrepreneurship – Environmental economics – Environmental finance – Equilibrium selection – Ethical consumerism – Euro – Event study – Evolutionary economics – Exceptionalism – Excess burden of taxation – Exogenous and endogenous variables – Exogenous growth model – Expected utility hypothesis – The Experience Economy – Experimental economics – Externality -Effective exchange rate

F
 Factor price equalization – Factors of production – Fair trade – Feminist economics – Finance – Financial astrology – Financial capital – Financial econometrics – Financial economics – Financial instrument – Fiscal policy – Fisher equation – Fisher separation theorem – Forecasting – Fractional-reserve banking – Free good – Free-rider problem – Free trade – Friedman rule – Full-reserve banking

G
 Game theory -Gandhian economics – General equilibrium – Geographical pricing – Georgism – Gerschenkron effect – Giffen good – Gini coefficient – Global game – Globalization – Gold standard – Good (economics) – Goodhart's law – Government debt – Government-granted monopoly – Gresham's law – Gross domestic product – Gross national product – Gross private domestic investment – Gross value added – Growth accounting - Green marketing

H
 Happiness economics – Harris–Todaro model – Hauser's Law – Hedonic regression – Herfindahl index – Heterodox economics – Historical school of economics – History of economic thought – Home economics – Homo economicus – Hotelling's law – Human capital – Human Development Index – Human development theory – Human resources – Hyperinflation

I
 Identity economics – Imperfect competition – Implied in fact contract – Import – Import substitution industrialization – Imputation (economics) – Incentive – Income – Income effect – Income elasticity of demand (YED) – Income inequality metrics – Income tax – Independent goods – Indifference curve – Indigo Era (economics) – Individual capital – Induced demand – Industrial organization – Industrial policy – Industrial Revolution – Industrialisation – Inferior good – Inflation – Informal sector – Information asymmetry – Information economics – Infrastructural capital – Input–output model – Institutional economics – Instructional capital – Interest – Interest rate parity – International economics – international finance – International trade – International Year of Microcredit – Intertemporal choice – Intertemporal equilibrium – Investment – Investment (macroeconomics) – Investment policy – Investment specific technological progress – Invisible hand – Islamic economic jurisprudence – IS/LM model – Isoquant – Ithaca Hours

J
 Jane Jacobs – JEL classification codes – Job hunting – Joint product pricing – Just price

K
 Kaldor-Hicks efficiency – Keynesian economics – Keynesian formula – Knowledge economy

L
 Labor theory of value – Labour economics – Labor union – Laffer curve – Laissez-faire – Land (economics) – Land value tax – Law and economics – Legal origins theory – Lerman ratio – Limit price – List of unsolved problems in economics – List of topics in industrial organization – Lemon market – Living wage – Local currency – Local purchasing – Lorenz curve – Low-carbon economy – Lucas critique – Luxury goods

M
 Macroeconomics – Making-up price – Managerial economics – Marginal cost – Marginal rate of substitution – Marginal revenue – Marginal utility – Marginalism – Market – Market anomaly – Market concentration – Market economy – Market failure – Market for lemons – Market power – Market share – Market structure – Market system – Markup rule – Marxian economics – Mathematical economics – Means of production – Measures of national income and output – Mechanism (sociology) – Medium of exchange – Mental accounting – Menu cost – Mercantilism – Merger simulation – Methodenstreit – Methodological individualism – Microcredit – Microeconomics – Minimum wage – Missing market – Model (macroeconomics) – Modern portfolio theory – Modigliani–Miller theorem – Monetarism – Monetary economics – Monetary policy – Monetary reform – Money – Money creation – Money multiplier – Money supply – Monopoly – Monopoly profit – Monopsony – Moral hazard

N
 NAIRU – Nakamura number – Nanoeconomics – Nash equilibrium – National Income and Product Accounts – Natural capital – Natural Capitalism – Natural monopoly – Natural resource economics – Neoclassical economics – Neo-Keynesian economics – Neoliberalism – Net investment – Network effect – Neuroeconomics – New classical macroeconomics – New Keynesian economics – Nobel Memorial Prize in Economic Sciences – Normal good - Nominal effective exchange rate

O
 Okun's law – Oligopoly – Oligopsony – Operations research – Opportunity cost – Ordinary least squares – Output (economics) – Overhead (business)

P
 Pacman conjecture – Parable of the broken window – Pareto efficiency – Participatory economics – Peltzman effect – Perfect competition – Perspectives on Capitalism – Petrocurrency – Phillips curve – Pigovian tax – Pluralism in economics – Policy-ineffectiveness proposition – Political economy – Potential output – Poverty – Poverty threshold – Preference – Price control – Price discrimination – Price elasticity of demand – Price point – Price specie flow mechanism – Principal–agent problem – Principles of Economics – Prisoner's dilemma – Product bundling – Production function – Production-possibility frontier – Production theory basics – Productivism – Productivity – Profit (economics) – Profit maximization – Property rights (economics) – Prospect theory – Public choice theory – Public bad – Public good – Purchasing power parity

Q
 Quality of life – Quasi-market – Quantitative easing – Quantity theory of money

R
 Rate of return pricing – Rational choice theory – Rational expectations – Rational pricing – Reaganomics – Real business-cycle theory – Real estate economics – Real estate investor – Real versus nominal value (economics) – Recession – Regenerative economic theory – Regional economics – Regression analysis – Remanufacturing – Rent control – Representative agent – Repugnancy costs – Reserve currency – Ricardian equivalence – Risk premium – Risk-free bond – Risk-free interest rate – Road pricing – Robin Hood effect - Real sectors

S
 Safe trade – Sales tax – Saving – Scarcity – Search theory – Self-revelation – Seven generation sustainability – Shock therapy (economics) – Signalling (economics) – Singer-Prebisch thesis – Slavery – Social capital – Social cost – Social Credit – Social finance – Social mobility – Social welfare function – Social welfare provision – Socialism – Socialist economics – Socioeconomics – Specialization (functional) – Spending multiplier – Stagflation – Standard of deferred payment – Standard of living – Stock exchange – Store of value – Strategic complements – Subgame perfect equilibrium – Subjective theory of value – Subsidy – Subsistence agriculture – Substitute good – Substitution effect – Sunk costs – Sunspot equilibrium – Sunspots (economics) – Supermodular function – Supply and demand – Supply-side economics – Surplus value – Sustainable development – Sweatshop

T
 Tariff – Tax – Tax, tariff and trade – Taylor rule – Technostructure – Terms of trade – Theory of the firm – Time-based currency – Time preference – Total cost of ownership – Trade – Trade bloc – Trade facilitation – Trade pact – Tragedy of the anticommons – Tragedy of the commons – Transaction cost – Transfer payment – Transfer pricing – Transformation problem – Transparency (market) – Transport economics – Triple bottom line – Trust (social sciences) – Two-part tariff – Tying (commerce)

U
 Underground economy – Uneconomic growth – Unemployment – Unionization – Unit of account – United States public debt – Universe (economics) – Urban economics – Utilitarianism – Utility – Utility maximization problem

V
 Value (economics) – Value added – Value added tax – Value of life – Veblen good – Velocity of money – Virtuous circle and vicious circle – von Neumann-Morgenstern utility function

W
 Wage – Wealth – Wealth effect – Welfare – Welfare economics – Welfare trap – Workers' self-management

X
 X-efficiency

Y
 Yield (finance) – YOYO economics

Z
 Zero-sum

See also

 Economics
 Glossary of economics
 List of accounting topics
 List of business law topics
 List of business theorists
 List of community topics
 List of economic communities
 List of economic reports by U.S. government agencies
 List of free trade agreements
 List of international trade topics
 List of management topics
 List of marketing topics 
 List of production functions
 List of production topics
 List of recessions in the United States
 List of scholarly journals in economics
 List of topics in industrial organization

Index

Economics
Economics